Orestias elegans may refer to:
 Orestias elegans (fish), a species of fish
 Orestias elegans (plant), a species of orchids